Agyneta ordinaria is a species of sheet weaver found in Canada and the United States. It was described by Chamberlin & Ivie in 1947.

References

ordinaria
Spiders of Canada
Spiders of the United States
Spiders described in 1947